The Oaklands railway line is a partly-closed railway line in New South Wales, Australia. It is a branch of the Main South line at The Rock, and heads in a south-westerly direction through the towns of Boree Creek and Urana, terminating at Oaklands.

The line opened to Lockhart in 1901, and to Oaklands in 1912. Passenger services were withdrawn in 1974, and the line is now closed beyond Boree Creek. Grain haulage provides the main traffic on the line.

From Oaklands, a line heads south to the Victorian border on the Murray River, and then to Benalla, Victoria. That line was formerly Victorian broad gauge, but was converted to standard gauge in 2009.

See also 
 Rail transport in New South Wales
 Oaklands railway line, Victoria

References 

Regional railway lines in New South Wales
Railway lines opened in 1912
1912 establishments in Australia
Standard gauge railways in Australia
Lockhart Shire